Jerome "Serocee" Thompson is an English hip hop/reggae artist and businessman. Serocee was born in Small Heath, Birmingham, England. Both Serocee's mother and father were sound system DJs and selectors during the British reggae movement of the 1970s. His father most notably was in the National Champion "Cosmic" sound.

Serocee is an accomplished DJ in his own right and has played at many clubs, house parties and even blues' (Jamaican all night dances). He has also been involved in many sound clashes as a DJ. He feels equally comfortable, be it on stage performing a rehearsed show, making up freestyle rap (off the top of his head where the crowd has provided subjects) or behind the decks. Serocee has been described as the epitome of the consummate professional.

Serocee is also the founder of the club night Rum 'n' Bass and since 2010 has held residencies across the UK taking his particular blend of Caribbean infused UK dancing music to the people.

Younger years
As a baby, Serocee was sent to his family's home town of Kingston, Jamaica, where he was schooled.

Young Serocee lived with his extended family while he was in Jamaica and this was where he had his first real exposure to Reggae music. From this point on, his lasting love affair with music was born.

Due to a strict Christian upbringing (by his aunt and uncle), reggae music was not allowed in the home, but it could be heard almost everywhere else. He recalls seeing a lot of big Reggae artists in their younger years, when they were freestyling on the corner. Regularly Sero would join in. As he was only young and had not yet honed his talent, he would merely recite lyrics that had already been recorded by established artists. All of this formed part of Serocee's performance schooling.

Serocee showed signs of his musical talent at an early age and his native roots still resonate through his work. Over the years, many have commented that his exposure and acceptance of different genres of music has helped to elevate him both as a performer and lyricist – thus setting him apart from his rivals.

Serocee penned his first melody at the age of eight and has gone on to write songs for himself and other notable artists. As a teenager he returned to Birmingham, England. Serocee found the transition tricky and often got into altercations with his new counterparts. He quickly became known for having clever/witty responses to any quips from his adversaries and soon his foes were suffering from a more verbal punishment. "We'd spend hours cussing/blazing at lunchtimes, during class, break times then after school – basically at any opportunity. I guess that was all part of my training". By the age of 14 Serocee and long-time friend DLT created a rap group called "Crossfire" and they achieved local success working with British Reggae Icons such as Pato Banton.

Being part of the Birmingham Hip Hop scene during the "Golden Years" of rap meant there were many battles going on whether it was in a club, on a sound system or on the street corner with somebody beat-boxing. Over those years battling, not only did Serocee gain plaudits from his peers, but he was also widely renowned as one of the best and most versatile freestyle rappers in Birmingham and won many competitions. It was from this point on, that Serocee became known for his ability to switch between Reggae and Rap. Not only was Serocee able to cross genres but his lyrical prowess demonstrated finesse as he always made a conscious effort to refrain from excessive profanity and derogatory lyrics.

Serocee's major musical influences span across a number of musical genres from Reggae to Jazz. The most notable artists to influence his music range from the likes of Bob Marley and Ninjaman to Nas, Redman, Stevie Wonder and Ray Charles. "The list goes on I suppose I have an eclectic musical pallet" Serocee said nonchalantly in an interview once.

Current
Since moving to London in 1999, he has been busy with various aspects of life both musically and day to day living, "People sometimes don't realise that music is like a relationship, one minute you're in love the next minute you can't stand it but for a musician you always end up making back up with it".

Serocee's debut single "Life" was released in 2006 and received critical acclaim. Since then he has released further singles and been involved on projects with Basement Jaxx, MJ Cole, Zed Bias, and Toddla T, plus Shaggy collaborators Brian and Tony Gold, General Levy, South Rakkas Crew, Lloyd Brown, Karl Hinds, Seanie T, Roots Manuva and Moorish Delta.

In addition to his extensive recording, Serocee has also been touring both as a solo artist and also with other groups namely Basement Jaxx, Public Enemy, The Roots, Busta Rhymes and many more. Serocee has also been involved with the "Whose Rhyme Is It Anyway" shows – this is where a completely improvised stageshow is created with full input from the audience.

Business ventures
In December 2008, Serocee founded the Windrushpickney brand, which is not only a reflection of his roots but it is also a way of life for many ethnic minorities living in Britain today. Windrushpickney consists of a Caribbean car rental company, a music publishing company and a record Label. Serocee's entrepreneurial ventures also stretch to a music production firm "No Long Ting Ltd" and a social magazine. Serocee also founded a club night called Rum 'n' Bass in 2010 and since then has held residencies in Brighton and South London.

Most recent work
Serocee still continues to record with Urban Monk and in August 2009 released the single "Bandeng". However, due to the major response it received it was remixed for re-release in March 2010.

Discography

Singles
Life/War, Illflava (2006)
Mr Government
Work Featuring Brian Gold Jambrum (2008)
You'll Never Find, Jambrum (2008)
Badeng, Jambrum (2010)
Oh Na Na, Jambrum (2011)
Troublemaker, Jambrum (2012)

Collaborations
Sero & Seanie (Seanie T) Muzic Ed Productions (2006)
Godbless (Moorish Delta 7) Seven (2006)
Murderer (Small Arms Fiya) 1965 Records (2007)
Inna Di Dancehall (Toddla T) 1965 Records (2007)
Give it to mi (Small Arms Fiya)
Jump Up Jump Down / Come Rest Up (Det Boi), Skint Records (2008)
Manabadman (Toddla T) 1965 Records (2008)
Badman, Machines Don't Care (2008)
Soundtape Killin (Toddla T) 1965 Records (2008)
AO (MJ Cole) Prolific Records (2009)
Wheel 'N' Stop (Basement Jaxx) XL (2009)
An Ting (Wio-k & Ty) White (2009)
I've Tried Ways (Sola Rosa) Way Up Records (2009)
Shake It (Toddla T) 1965 Records (2009)
Be With You (Lobster Boy) Run Music (2009)
Fiyah with Profisee, EDO G and Mr Bang On (Capitol 1212)1212 Records 2010 
So It Go (South Rakkas Crew) Mad Decent (2010)
Champion Sound (South Rakkas Crew) Mad Decent (2010)
Rise (South Rakkas Crew) Mad Decent (2010)
Dance Wid We (South Rakkas Crew) Mad Decent (2010)
Badman Flu (Toddla T) Ninjatune (2011)

Compilations appeared on
Top Class of 2006 (Suspect Packages)
The Heard 2007 (Stronghorn Records)
Fabric Mix Live 47 2009 (Fabric, London)
Fact Mix 67 2009 (Fact Music)

Music videos
"You'll Never Find"
"Life"
"Whose Rhyme Is It Anyway"
"The Heard "Bigger Than Us""

References

English hip hop musicians
English reggae musicians
Living people
Musicians from Birmingham, West Midlands
Year of birth missing (living people)